Kim Jun-su (born December 15, 1986) or simply Junsu, also known by the stage name Xia (stylized as XIA;) is a South Korean singer, model, dancer and stage actor. He is a member of the Korean pop group and later duo JYJ, and was one of the original members of boy band TVXQ.

Kim made his debut in 2003 as a member of TVXQ, a boy band produced and formed by South Korean record label and talent agency SM Entertainment, having previously been a trainee for six years. He had released four Korean albums, four Japanese albums, thirty Japanese singles and several Korean singles during his first six years in the music industry as TVXQ. In 2009, Kim and fellow TVXQ members Kim Jaejoong and Park Yoochun filed a lawsuit against SM Entertainment, arguing that their exclusive contracts were unilaterally disadvantageous towards the artists and should be invalidated. The Seoul Central District Court ruled in favor of the three and granted an injunction suspending their contracts. The trio reunited and subsequently formed JYJ (formerly known as JUNSU/JAEJOONG/YOOCHUN in Japan). As JYJ, Kim has released one English album, two Korean albums, one Japanese EP, and one Korean EP.

Kim began his solo career in 2010 with the release of Japanese EP Xiah, which peaked at number-two on Japan's Oricon singles chart. The same year, he took the role of Wolfgang in his debut musical Mozart!, receiving critical acclaim and commercial success. After the release of Xiah, Kim's solo music career was sent into hiatus because of a discord between him and his Japanese label Avex Trax that led to the sudden suspension of all his activities in Japan. In May 2012, he released his first full-length Korean solo studio album Tarantallegra, while being represented by new management agency C-JeS Entertainment. Following the release, he embarked on his first headlining world tour. He returned with his second Korean solo studio album, Incredible, in July 2013.

Despite limitations in media coverage and promotional activities caused by a ban in the Entertainment Departments of South Korea's three main terrestrial broadcasters resulting from SM Entertainment's interference, Kim's first and second studio album reached top two on the Gaon albums chart in South Korea, as well as reaching number-ten and number-five on the Billboard World Albums chart for Tarantallegra and Incredible, respectively. He is also known for being able to sell out tickets for his concerts and musicals within minutes, dubbed "the ticket power" by South Korean media.

Biography

Pre-debut
Kim was born and raised in Gyeonggi-do, South Korea. He has an older fraternal twin brother named Kim Junho, who is also a singer mainly active in Japan and China where he is more well known by his stage names JUNO and ZUNO. At age eleven, Kim was signed by SM Entertainment after his participation in the agency's the 6th Annual Starlight Casting System.

He attended Neunggok Elementary School, Nunggok Middle School, Hwasu High School and then transferred to Hanam High School. He graduated high school along with fellow member Park Yoochun in 2007. Kim Junsu then took up Musical Theater in Myongji University and graduated in 2011.
  
In 2002, SM Entertainment placed Junsu in a project R&B group with two other trainees, his childhood friend Eunhyuk and Sungmin. They appeared on a show called "2002 Survival Audition – Heejun vs. Kangta, Battle of the Century", along with three future members of rock band TRAX (Jay Kim, No Minwoo, Kang Jungwoo). They were judged and mentored by Moon Hee Jun and Kangta, two members of H.O.T, SM Entertainment's former group. Kangta praised Kim highly in the show, saying that he had potential as a lead vocalist. The group disbanded in 2003 (both Eunhyuk and Sungmin went on to debut as Super Junior's members two years later), when Kim was selected to be TVXQ's member.

2003–2009: Early career

Kim was the first member to join TVXQ and officially debuted with the group on December 26, 2003. He chose Xiah to be his stage name, explaining that the name was short for "Asia" (taking out the "a" in "Asia"). "Xiah" would be an implication of his desire to become not only a star in Korea, but also a star recognized all throughout Asia.

In 2006, Kim featured in former label-mate Zhang Liyin's debut song, "Timeless". It is a remake of Kelly Clarkson and Justin Guarini's duet, originally recorded in 2003. He also made an appearance in the second part of "Timeless"' music video. In 2007, he was chosen to be part of Samsung's Anycall project group, Anyband. The band comprises former label-mate female singer BoA, Tablo of South Korean hip-hop group Epik High and jazz pianist Jin Bora. Anyband has only released one single of the same name.

On July 31, 2009, Kim and other two TVXQ members—Jaejoong and Yoochun—submitted an application to the Seoul Central District Court to determine the validity of their contract with SM Entertainment. Through their lawyers, the members stated that the 13-year contract was excessively long, schedules were held out without the confirmation or permission of the members, contract terms had been extended and changed without their knowledge or consent and that the group's earnings were not fairly distributed to the members. The Seoul Central District Court granted the three members a temporary contract injunction in October 2009 and ruled that SM cannot interfere with their individual activities but also that they can only act as members of TVXQ through SM Entertainment.

In November 2012, the three years and four months lawsuit concluded as SM Entertainment and JYJ reached a mutual agreement to terminate all contracts between the two parties and not to interfere with each other's activities in the future. At a voluntary arbitration at the Seoul Central District Court, SM Entertainment finally agreed that its contract ended July 31, 2009, and that it would no longer interfere with JYJ's endeavors in Korea.

Throughout his career as TVXQ's member, Kim had written and composed several songs that appeared on the group's Korean and Japanese releases. His first composition was a ballad titled "Nae Gyeote Sumsuil Su Ittdamyeon (White Lie)" (네 곁에 숨쉴 수 있다면), included in TVXQ's third Korean studio album, "O"-Jung.Ban.Hap. At TVXQ's second Asian tour, he performed a solo self-composed dance track called "My Page". He also composed his solo slow-ballad "Rainy Night" of TVXQ's nineteenth Japanese single, If.../Rainy Night, an installment of the group's non-album release "TRICK" project. For TVXQ's Korean comeback in 2008, he wrote "Noeur... Baraboda (Picture of You)" (노을 ... 바라보다), which was featured in TVXQ's fourth Korean album. During TVXQ's third Asian tour, he performed another self-composed song "Xiahtic", which was then rearranged and performed in Japanese for his solo performance at the Tohoshinki 4th Live Tour 2009: The Secret Code in Tokyo Dome. The rearranged version of "Xiahtic" was also included in TVXQ's twenty-ninth Japanese single. He has also appeared on two televised shows with TVXQ, Banjun Theater and Vacation.

2010–2011: Solo career and JYJ

At the beginning of 2010, Kim starred in the South Korean production of Austrian musical Mozart!, playing the lead role Wolfgang. His stage actor debut was met with great response, as the tickets for each one of his shows were completely sold out and he was able to sweep up all Best Newcomer awards in various awards ceremonies.

In April, the three-member group JYJ (initially known as Junsu/Jaejoong/Yoochun) was created, following an announcement made by Avex Trax, the trio's Japanese label at that time. After Avex revealed that TVXQ would go on an indefinite hiatus, it's decided that Kim would make his solo singing debut in Japan. A teaser showing his self-composed song "Intoxication" was made public and announced as the lead track of his upcoming single. The self-produced double A-side single (Refer Xiah) was released on May 26 and debuted at number two on Japan's Oricon chart. Two songs in the single,  and "君がいれば ～Beautiful Love～" were used as the theme song for BeeTV's  and <Beautiful Love ～君がいれば～>.

In September, JYJ released The..., their first Japanese EP, which debuted at number one on the Oricon chart. However, Avex had announced the suspension of the group's activities in Japan, including Kim's, the same month that year. JYJ proceeded to release The Beginning, a global album which was sung in English. Kim promoted the new album with JYJ via a worldwide showcase tour with dates in South Korea, Southeast Asia and the United States.

In October, Kim was set to collaborate with Hungarian composer Sylvester Levay for a concert titled "Kim Junsu Musical Concert, Levay with Friends". It was held in Seoul at the Olympic Gymnastics Arena from the 7th until the 10th for a total of 4 days. Well-known German musical actor Uwe Kröger who worked with Levay in several musicals visited South Korea to participate in the concert as a special guest. During the show, Kim introduced "Miss You So", a song that was written especially for him by Levay, to the fans. He also performed "Intoxication" before Korean audience for the first time outside Japan.

January 2011 saw the release of JYJ's Korean EP, Their Rooms "Our Story". Kim contributed in writing and composing two songs in the album, an up-tempo track titled "Mission" and a ballad titled "Fallen Leaves". The next month, he starred in his second musical, "Tears of Heaven". Kim played Jun-Hyung, a Korean soldier who fell in love with a Vietnamese singer during the Vietnam war.

Starting from April, Kim toured Asia and North America for JYJ's first Worldwide Tour. The tour was later extended to Europe and South America, adding another four stops in Spain, Germany, Chile and Peru. In May, Kim was appointed the honorary ambassador for the 5th The Musical Awards, along with musical actress Jo Jung Eun. He's also nominated for "Best Actor" and later won the "Popular Star Award" at the same award ceremony. In August, Kim released a song for Korean drama Scent of A Woman's OST, "You Are So Beautiful". The song managed to top real-time music charts shortly after it was released. He also made a cameo appearance in the drama as a popular singer that the main character idolizes and looks up to. In September, JYJ released their first Korean full-length album, In Heaven. Kim and actress Song Ji-hyo featured in the six minutes long music video for the album's lead track, "In Heaven". A 10-minutes version was released later on, revealing the complete story line. In November, Kim won the "Popular Star Award" at the 17th Korea Musical Awards alongside "Tears of Heaven" co-star Yoon Gong Joo. In December, he and South Korean actor Jang Geun-Suk received a K-POP Superstar Award at the "2011 Asia Jewelry Awards" held in Seoul.

2012–2014: Tarantallegra and Incredible

Kim released his first Korean full-length solo album, Tarantallegra, in May 2012. It was his first solo music release in two years, after the suspension of his solo activities in 2010. For the album, he directly took part in the production, composing and writing the lyrics for most of the songs. Rapper Flowsik of Asian-American music group Aziatix featured in the album's title track, "Tarantallegra". After unleashing two concept teasers, Kim released a video teaser for "Tarantallegra", where he showed a drastic transformation into a completely new image. The music video was published in full on May 13, a day before the official album release. To promote the album, he held concerts within Asia, as well as North America, South America and Europe. The Asian tour began on May 19 and 20 at Seoul's Jamsil Indoor Stadium and continued on to Thailand, Indonesia, Taiwan, China and Hong Kong. Ahead of the North American, South American, and European tour, C-JeS Entertainment revealed that Kim had finished recording an English song and planned for a new single release. The single, titled Uncommitted is written by Bruce 'Automatic' Vanderveer, and includes a new version of song "Tarantallegra". Kim also confirmed his remaining tour dates with stops in New York, Los Angeles, Mexico, Brasil, Chile and Germany. The first show was held at New York's Hammerstein Ballroom and the final show held at Turbinenhalle in Oberhausen. While touring Kim, along with Sunny Hill's Seung-ah, made an appearance in South Korean girl group, Fiestar's music video for their debut single, "Vista".

In October 2012, Kim won his first "Best Actor" award at the 18th Korea Musical Awards for his performance as the transcendental existence Der Tod or The Death, a lead role in the Elisabeth, his third musical. He had also received third consecutive "Popular Star Award" at the annual The Musical Awards in June. On Christmas Eve, Kim released a digital single, Thank U For, before holding an all-live concert entitled "2012 XIA Ballad & Musical Concert with Orchestra" on the 29th. The concert featured ballads from his album as well as OST songs and a few pieces from his previous musicals, accompanied by an orchestra during the whole show. By the end of 2012, Kim has sold almost 200,000 copies of Tarantallegra and Uncommitted combined, becoming one of the year's highest selling solo artists on South Korea's record chart Gaon.

On February 25, 2013, Kim (as JYJ) was invited to perform at South Korea's current president Park Geun-hye's inauguration ceremony held at the National Assembly Building's Center Plaza, in front of more than 70,000 people. Two months later, Kim took the stage for JYJ's three days concert, "The Return of JYJ", held at the Tokyo Dome. The sold-out concert marks the first time JYJ had been able to perform in Japan after the contract with their former Japanese management agency Avex ended in 2010.

Incredible, Kim's second Korean studio album, was released in July 2013. Its lead track, "Incredible", was made by Bruce 'Automatic' Vanderveer, who he collaborated with on his first English single. Prior to the album release, Kim unveiled a digital single which will serve as pre-release track, called "11AM". On the 15th, he held a solo showcase at UNIQLO AX Hall in Seoul to commemorate the official release of Incredible. His second headlining concert tour began the following week with its first stop in Bangkok, Thailand.

Junsu later held a solo tour in Japan, called the "2014 XIA The Best Ballad Spring Tour Concert in Japan," starting in Tokyo on May 13–15 and then heading to Osaka on May 22–24. The poster for the concert was released early April.

2015–2017: Solo albums and musicals 
On March, 3rd 2015 Kim's third studio album Flower was released. The album debuted at number 1 on the Gaon and Oricon charts. The title song Flower features Tablo from Epik High, with Dok2 and Naul (Brown Eyed Soul) also featuring on the album. On the same day of the album release Kim launched 2015 Xia Third Asia Tour Concert – Flower with the first stop being Osaka.

In April 2015 Kim was confirmed to act in the Korean version of the musical Death Note. Kim played the role of L.

Kim announced that he would be returning with a mini album and released the title song Yesterday on October 19, 2015. Rapper Giriboy features on track "Oeo" while Cheetah is a feature on "Midnight Show".

Kim featured on rapper Psy's seventh album Psyder, with the song "Dream".

Kim placed 1st place in the ballot of the Domestic Popularity Award carried out by the ‘25th High1 Seoul Music Awards’ from November 27, 2015, to January 12, 2016. XIA won a total of 46.7% of votes in the ballot for the Popularity Award domestically chosen 100% by voting results beforehand, and recorded 1st place.

In May 2016, his fourth solo album, Xignature was released, featuring The Quiett, Automatic, Crucial Star and Paloalto. Later he played the lead role in two musicals, Dracula and Dorian Gray.

At the beginning of 2017, Kim again took up the role of L in the Death Note musical, before he enlisted in the army as a conscripted policeman.

2018–present: Discharge from military, musicals and other works 
Kim was discharged from military service on November 5, 2018, and started promotions with a fansigning event at COEX Live Plaza. He held a 3-day concert 'Way Back Xia' at Jamsil Indoor Stadium. After his discharge, Kim returned to the stage to his role of Death in the musical Elizabeth. Kim is slated to star in the musical Xcalibur as King Arthur from June 15 to August 4, 2019, at the Sejong Center for the Performing Arts, Seoul.

On November 10, 2020, Kim released a mini album titled Pit a Pat under his stage name XIA.

On November 9, 2021, C-JeS Entertainment's contract with Kim expired and he decided not to renew. Later, it was reported that Kim founded Palm Tree Island Agency, a single agency.

On March 16, 2022, Kim released his third mini album titled Dimension, the first after his departure from C-JeS Entertainment.  He has also announced a face-to-face offline concert to commemorate the release of his new album.

In June 2022, Kim organized the KIMJUNSU 2022 CONCERT 'DIMENSION in BANGKOK held at Thunder Dome Bangkok, Thailand on June 25.

In November 2022, it was announced that Kim will hold Junsu Kim's year-end concert '2022 XIA Ballad & Musical Concert with Orchestra Vol.8' will be held at COEX Hall D for three days from December 23 to 25.

Personal life
Junsu began his 21 months mandatory military service on February 9, 2017. He was discharged on November 5, 2018.

Discography

 Tarantallegra (2012)
 Incredible (2013)
 Flower (2015)
 Xignature (2016)

Concerts and tours
 XIA 1st World Tour Concert – Tarantallegra 
 XIA 2nd Asia Tour Concert – Incredible
 2012 XIA Ballad & Musical Concert with Orchestra vol.1
 2013 XIA Ballad & Musical Concert with Orchestra vol.2
 2014 XIA The Best Ballad Spring Tour Concert in Japan 
 2014 XIA Ballad & Musical Concert with Orchestra vol.3
 2015 XIA 3rd Asia Tour Concert – Flower
 2015 XIA 4th Asia Tour Concert – Yesterday
 2015 XIA Ballad & Musical Concert with Orchestra vol.4
 2016 XIA The Best Ballad Spring Tour Concert in Japan vol.2
 2016 XIA 5th Asia Tour Concert – Xignature
 2016 XIA Ballad & Musical Concert with Orchestra vol.5
 2018 Way Back Xia
2019 Way Back Xia Tour in Japan
2019 Way Back Xia Encore
2019 XIA Ballad & Musical Concert with Orchestra vol.6
2020 XIA Pit A Pat Online concert
2020 XIA Ballad & Musical Online concert with orchestra
2022 XIA Ballad & Musical Concert with Orchestra vol.8

Filmography

Television shows

Musicals

Awards

Notes

References

External links

 C-JeS Homepage – Kim Junsu

1987 births
Living people
JYJ members
South Korean male idols
South Korean pop singers
South Korean male singers
South Korean rhythm and blues singers
English-language singers from South Korea
South Korean male musical theatre actors
South Korean male television actors
Japanese-language singers of South Korea
TVXQ members
K-pop singers
South Korean humanitarians
SM Entertainment artists
People from Gyeonggi Province
Myongji University alumni
South Korean twins
Twin musicians
Fraternal twin male actors